Ramesh Rathod is an Indian politician from the state of Telangana, belonging to Bharatiya Janata Party from 2021. In the 2009 election he was elected as a Member of Parliament (MP) from Telugu Desam Party to the Lok Sabha from the Adilabad constituency of erstwhile Andhra Pradesh.

Political career 
A first time MP, he belongs to the Scheduled Tribes caste. A grassroots politician, he has had a long association with local causes in the state. He was elected to Andhra Pradesh State Legislative Assembly in 1999 from Khanapur Assembly Seat (reserved for STs). He was also the Chairman of the Adilabad Zilla Parishad (2006–09). His wife, Mrs Suman Rathod represented the Khanapur assembly seat(2009–14). and also he was elected as MLA from Khanapur assembly. He contested from congress party in 2018 Telangana assembly elections.

In June 2021, he joined BJP following a controversial resignation of Etela Rajender.

References

India MPs 2009–2014
People from Adilabad district
Andhra Pradesh MLAs 1999–2004
National Democratic Alliance candidates in the 2014 Indian general election
Telangana politicians
Telangana district councillors
Telugu Desam Party politicians
Lok Sabha members from Andhra Pradesh
Indian National Congress politicians from Telangana
Bharatiya Janata Party politicians from Telangana
1966 births
Living people